Lidya Djaelawijaya (born 15 October 1974) is a former Indonesian badminton player, who play in the singles event. She won the Russian Open in 1995, and Indonesia Open in 1999. Djaelawijaya was part of the Indonesia women's team that won the 1996 Uber Cup. The team also reach in to the semi-finals in 2000, clinched the bronze medal. Djaelawijaya competed at the 2000 Summer Olympics in Sydney, Australia, finished in the third round.

Achievements

Asian Championships 
Women's singles

Asian Cup 
Women's singles

Southeast Asian Games 
Women's singles

IBF World Grand Prix (2 titles, 1 runner-up) 
The World Badminton Grand Prix has been sanctioned by the International Badminton Federation from 1983 to 2006.

Women's singles

 IBF Grand Prix tournament
 IBF Grand Prix Finals tournament

References

External links 
 
 

1974 births
Living people
People from Tasikmalaya
Sportspeople from West Java
Indonesian people of Chinese descent
Indonesian female badminton players
Badminton players at the 2000 Summer Olympics
Olympic badminton players of Indonesia
Competitors at the 1995 Southeast Asian Games
Competitors at the 1999 Southeast Asian Games
Competitors at the 2001 Southeast Asian Games
Southeast Asian Games gold medalists for Indonesia
Southeast Asian Games silver medalists for Indonesia
Southeast Asian Games bronze medalists for Indonesia
Southeast Asian Games medalists in badminton